Proceratosaurus is a genus of carnivorous theropod dinosaur from the Middle Jurassic (Bathonian) of England. It contains a single species. P. bradleyi, known from a mostly complete skull and lower jaws. Its name refers to how it was originally thought to be an ancestor of Ceratosaurus, due to the partially preserved portion of the crest of Proceratosaurus superficially resembling the small crest of Ceratosaurus. Now, however, it is considered a coelurosaur, specifically a member of the family Proceratosauridae, and amongst the earliest known members of the clade Tyrannosauroidea.

The type specimen is held in the Natural History Museum in London and was described in 1910 from oolitic limestone of the Great Oolite Group near Minchinhampton while excavating for a reservoir.

History of discovery 

In 1910, the British paleontologist Arthur Smith Woodward reported a partial theropod skull discovered some time prior by F. Lewis Bradley during excavation for a reservoir at Minchinhampton, a town in the Cotswolds in Gloucestershire, England. Bradley had prepared the skull so that the left side was exposed, and submitted it to the Geological Society of London, which is currently housed at the Natural History Museum catalogued as specimen NHM R 4860. The upper part of the skull missing due to a fissure that had eroded the rock, and was partially filled with calcite. Woodward made the skull the holotype specimen of a new species of Megalosaurus (a genus named in 1824), M. bradleyi, in honour of its discoverer. At the time it was discovered, it was one of the most complete theropod skulls known from Europe, possibly with the exception of the crushed and hard to interpret skulls of Compsognathus and Archaeopteryx.

In 1923, the German palaeontologist Friedrich von Huene moved the species to the new genus Proceratosaurus, assuming it was the ancestor of the Jurassic genus Ceratosaurus, but since the name was only used in a schematic, the name has been considered a nomen nudum, an invalidly published name. He validated the name three years later in two 1926 articles by providing a diagnosis of the genus. While remaining one of the best preserved theropod skulls in Europe, and globally one of the best preserved Middle Jurassic theropod skulls, it since received little scientific attention, mainly being mentioned in studies about general aspects of theropod anatomy and evolution. The holotype skull was since CT scanned at the University of Texas, further mechanically prepared to reveal additional details of the skull, jaw, and teeth, and was re-described by the German palaeontologist Oliver W. M. Rauhut and colleagues in 2010.

Description

Classification
Arthur Smith Woodward, who initially studied Proceratosaurus, placed it as a species of Megalosaurus, due to same number of premaxillary teeth (4). Later study during the 1930s by Friedrich von Huene suggested a closer relationship with Ceratosaurus, and Huene thought both dinosaurs represented members of the group Coelurosauria.

It was not until the late 1980s, after Ceratosaurus had been shown to be a much more primitive theropod and not a coelurosaur, that the classification of Proceratosaurus was again re-examined. Gregory S. Paul suggested that it was a close relative of Ornitholestes, again mainly due to the crest on the nose (though the idea that Ornitholestes bore a nasal crest was later disproved). Paul considered both Proceratosaurus and Ornitholestes to be neither ceratosaurs nor coelurosaurs, but instead primitive allosauroids. Furthermore, Paul considered the much larger dinosaur Piveteausaurus to be the same genus as Proceratosaurus, making Piveteausaurus a junior synonym. However, no overlapping bones between the two had yet been exposed from the rock around their fossils, and future study showed that they were indeed distinct.

Several phylogenetic studies in the early 21st century finally found Proceratosaurus (as well as Ornitholestes) to be a coelurosaur, only distantly related to the ceratosaurids and allosauroids, though one opinion published in 2000 considered Proceratosaurus a ceratosaurid without presenting supporting evidence. Phylogenetic analyses by Thomas R. Holtz Jr. in 2004 also placed Proceratosaurus among the coelurosaurs, though with only weak support, and again found an (also weakly supported) close relationship with Ornitholestes.

The first major re-evaluation of Proceratosaurus and its relationships was published in 2010 by Oliver Rauhut and colleagues. Their study concluded that Proceratosaurus was in fact a coelurosaur, and moreover a tyrannosauroid, a member of the lineage leading to the giant tyrannosaurs of the Late Cretaceous. Furthermore, they found that Proceratosaurus was most closely related to the Chinese tyrannosauroid Guanlong. They named the clade containing these two dinosaurs the Proceratosauridae, defined as all theropods closer to Proceratosaurus than to Tyrannosaurus, Allosaurus, Compsognathus, Coelurus, Ornithomimus, or Deinonychus.

Below is a cladogram from a 2022 study by Darren Naish and Andrea Cau on the genus Eotyrannus:

Palaeobiology 

Proceratosaurus possessed a nasal crest, which may have served as a display organ but also possibly served to reduce bending stresses on the skull when biting. This may indicate Proceratosaurus used a puncture-pull strategy for hunting prey. However, Proceratosaurus was likely not a big game hunter, lacking the bone-crushing teeth and extremely powerful bites of the tyrannosaurids. Instead, it possessed an elongated skull, commonly found in basal coelurosaurs and basal tyrannosauroids.

Paleoenvironment 
The flora from the roughly equivalently aged Taynton Limestone Formation in Oxfordshire is dominated by araucarian and cheirolepidiacean conifers as well as bennettitaleans and Pelourdea, representing a probably seasonally dry coastal environment. Other dinosaurs known from equivalently aged deposits from the Bathonian of Britain include the large theropod Megalosaurus, the sauropod Cetiosaurus, as well as indeterminate ornithschians. A diverse microvertebrate fauna is known from the equivalently aged Forest Marble Formation, including frogs, salamanders, turtles, choristoderes, lizards, rhynchocephalians, crocodyliformes, and mammaliamorphs including tritylodontids, morganucodonts, docodonts, allotherians and eutriconodonts.

See also 
 Timeline of tyrannosaur research

References

External links 
 3D scan of the holotype skull on Sketchfab

Proceratosaurids
Bathonian life
Middle Jurassic dinosaurs of Europe
Jurassic England
Fossils of England
Fossil taxa described in 1926
Taxa named by Friedrich von Huene